Cengiz Küçükayvaz (born 30 July 1968) is a Turkish actor who usually appears in comedic roles.

Biography
Cengiz Küçükayvaz graduated in Theatre from Dokuz Eylül University's Faculty of Fine Arts. He began his professional acting career at the Tuncay Özinel Theatre and the Hadi Çaman Theatre. Küçükayvaz has appeared in several films and TV series including Reyting Hamdi, Çiçek Taksi, Lalelide bir Azize, Kahpe Bizans, the rebooted Hababam Sınıfı series, Maskeli Beşler series, Süper Ajan K-9 and Yedi Kocalı Hürmüz.

In 2008, he founded the Cengiz Küçükayvaz Theatre, named after himself.
In the nineties, he also took part in the clip of Kibariye's song, "Alıştık artık". (literal translation is "We get used to it")

Partial filmography

Hoş Memo (1993)
Çifte Vakkas (1993)
Sonradan Görmeler (1994)
Çiçek Taksi (1995, TV Series) - Ömer Sen
Çılgın Bediş (1996, TV Series)
Yasemince (1997, TV Series)
Gemide (1998) - Henchman III
Kaygısızlar (1998, TV Series) - Tayfun
Laleli'de Bir Aziz (1998) - Doktor
Naylon Kemal (1998)
Mualla (1998)
Kahpe Bizans (1999) - Simitis
Kadınlar Kulübü (1999, TV Series)
Parça Pinçik (2000, TV Mini-Series)
Hemşo (2001)
Yeşil Işık (2002)
Reyting Hamdi (2002)
Ömerçip (2003) - Kahya
Hababam Sınıfı: Merhaba (2003) - Kötü Kenan / Kenan the Evil
Şöhretler Kebapçıs (2003)
Cennet Mahallesi (2004)
Biz Boşanıyoruz (2004, TV Mini-Series) - Ali Kiran
Hababam Sınıfı Askerde (2004) - Kotu Kenan
Sevda Tepesi (2005, TV Mini-Series) - Bakkal Mülayim
Emret Komutanım (2005)
Maskeli Beşler: İntikam Peşinde (2005) - Kamil
Hababam Sınıfı 3,5 (2005) - Kotu Kenan
Çılgın Yuva (2005, TV Series) - Çetin
Avrupa Yakası (2005)
Küçük Hanımefendi (2006)
Daha Neler (2006)
Acemi Cadı (2006)
Eve Dönüş (2006) - Cahit
Maskeli Beşler: Irak (2007) - Onbasi Kamil
Emret Komutanım: Şah Mat (2007) - Habip
Küçük Hanımefendinin Şoförü (2007, TV Movie)
Düş Yakamdan (2007, TV Series) - Ugur
Sardunya Sokağı (2007)
Yasak Elma (2007)
Şöhret Okulu (2007)
Maskeli Beşler: Kıbrıs (2008) - Kamil
Süper Ajan K9 (2008) - De Sifre
Derman (2008)
Ece (2008, TV Series) - Perte
7 Kocalı Hürmüz (2009) - Barber Hasan
Harbi Define (2010) - Cemil
Çakallarla Dans (2010) - Adnan
Sov bizinis (2011)
Kız Annesi (2011, TV Series) - Cevher
İkizler Firarda (2012) - Kazim
Şipşak Anadolu (2013)
Evliya Çelebi ve Ölümsüzlük Suyu (2014) - Kaz (voice)
Can Tertip (2015)
Kertenkele (2015)
Arka Sokaklar (2015)
Klavye Delikanlıları (2017, TV Series)
Hayvanat bahçesi (2018)

References

External links

1968 births
Living people
People from Uşak
Turkish comedians
Turkish male film actors
Turkish male television actors
Dokuz Eylül University alumni
20th-century Turkish male actors
21st-century Turkish male actors